Progressive Dane is an independent, progressive political party in Dane County, Wisconsin founded in the fall of 1992.

Focusing exclusively on local elections, Progressive Dane endorses candidates and lobbies for issues decided on by its membership. It currently boasts seven members of the Madison Common Council, three members of the Dane County Board of Supervisors, three of the seven members of the Madison School Board and one member of the Fitchburg Common Council. It has tenuous relationships and substantial membership overlap with the Wisconsin Green Party.

Elections in all of the above entities are non-partisan; no party names appear on ballots, and there are no party primaries held. Thus, while Progressive Dane calls itself a political party, the question of whether to support or oppose nominees of the Democratic, Green or other parties does not arise.

Progressive Dane has both a city and a county party platform.  Revised in 2011, Progressive Dane's county platform lists many progressive policies such as living wages and economic development, open and democratic government, public safety and protection, land use, transportation and environmental protection, affordable housing, quality human services and efficient, effective government.  Progressive Dane's city platform was last revised in 2010 and it identifies the following goals and principles: Improve quality social services and public health; seek sustainable economic development, progressive tax justice and responsible land use; provide safe, efficient, accessible transportation; support affordable housing and tenant rights, an open and democratic government, and support employment rights of city employees and protect civil rights and liberties.

The party has received harsh criticism from such local media as the Wisconsin State Journal and won plaudits from local progressive media, including The Capital Times.

Progressive Dane achieved a high level of electoral success in the early-2000s, when Madison mayor and Progressive Dane member Dave Cieslewicz remarked, "For all intents and purposes, they are the [city’s] governing party right now."

In 2022, the party reported seven members on the twenty-member Madison Common Council, four on the thirty seven-member Dane County Board of Supervisors, and one member on the seven-member Madison Metropolitan School District Board of Education.

References

External sources
Progressive Dane website

Regional and state political parties in the United States
Political parties established in 1992
Political parties in Wisconsin
Dane County, Wisconsin
Progressive parties in the United States
1992 establishments in Wisconsin